Superhero is the sixth album by American singer Brian McKnight. It was first released by Motown Records on August 28, 2001 in the United States. McKnight recorded this album to showcase his many musical influences and give listeners a glimpse into the past year of his life. Superhero mixes McKnight's usual contemporary R&B style with a touch of rock and roll and rap music. McKnight worked with a variety of producers on the album, including Battlecat, Bill Meyers, Anthony Nance, Steve Thompson, and Lavel "City Spud" Webb. Featured guest vocalists were Justin Timberlake, Nate Dogg, Fred Hammond, and hip hop group St. Lunatics.

The album received favorable reviews from music critics, who called it McKnight's most adventurous and ambitious album yet, and debuted at number seven on the US Billboard 200, moving 153,000 units in its first week. While this marked McKnight's biggest first week sales, it failed to duplicate the multi-platinum success of previous album Back at One (1999), reaching gold status. In 2002, McKnight released several new songs on a reissue of the album, titled Superhero & More. At the 44th Annual Grammy Awards, three songs from the album, including singles "Love of My Life" and "Still," earned four nominations.

Background
Superhero was produced after the release of McKnight's biggest-selling album Back at One which sold more than 3.0 million copies worldwide and was certified triple platinum by the Recording Industry Association of America (RIAA) and platinum by Music Canada. The album produced three singles, including its title track, which reached number two in the US, becoming his highest-charting single yet, and garnered nominations for the Grammy Award for Best R&B Album and the Soul Train Music Award for Best R&B/Soul Album. McKnight reteamed with Anthony Nance and consulted new collaborators such as Battlecat, Bill Meyers, Steve Thompson, and Lavel "City Spud" Webb to work with him on his sixth studio album.

In a promotional interview with Billboard, McKnight commented on Superhero: "It's everything I'm about, personality-wise and music-wise. There's a lot iof jazz influence, a little rock, an obvious R&B thing and inspirational music. My other albums were basically undergrad. This record is my graduation." In the album booklet, he further elaborated: "Superheroes are people who do things everyday that go unrecognized... teachers, firemen, police, parents. That sort of grace is what I aspire to and what people should aspire to. These songs talk about those moments and frankly, the sort of man I hope to be. You can view this album as a diary of the past year of my life and these songs as a beacon for me to try to reach higher."

Critical reception

Superhero garnered generally positive reviews from music critics. Allmusic editor Liana Jonas remarked that "the recording essentially offers up the same romantic and sensitive mid-tempo R&B love songs McKnight has become famous for. However, there are some choice departures by McKnight, reflecting his adventurous side [...] While the album is not groundbreaking, it does show consistency and growth by the talented McKnight. Is it super? No. Worthy? Yes." Cheo Tyehimba of Entertainment Weekly gave the album a B grade and went on to say: "Combining that superpower with his formulaic, but potent songwriting skills, he's created an ambitious CD of mid-tempo hip hop, rock, and gospel grooves [...] Fans won’t be disappointed."

In addition, Lana K. Wilson-Combs from Sacramento News & Review gave the album praise. She explained: "Brian McKnight, one of the most consistent pop balladeers, shows on this new release that he hasn’t lost his street cred [...] McKnight – who’s cut from the same old-school cloth as Teddy Pendergrass, Marvin Gaye and Luther Vandross – specializes in sensuous love songs. Here he doesn’t disappoint." Michael Paoletta Billboard found that the album "does have its flaws [...] but swaying midtempos [...]  make up for such missteps. In the end, Superhero is a much welcome addition to McKnight's solid ouevre." Dmitri Ehrlich, writing for Vibe, called Superhero his "most adventurous album". He further elaborated: "Of course, some songs are still as cheesy Velveeta [...] but McKnight is generally intent on proving with this album that he can move beyond his usually light but eminently listenable terrain. Now he's starting to get interesting."

Accolades
McKnight was nominated in the Outstanding Male Artist category at the 2002 NAACP Image Awards for his work on Superhero. In addition, he was nominated for four Grammy Awards for his work on the album, with "Love Of My Life" and  "Still" receiving a nods in the Best Male R&B Vocal Performance category, "My Kind of Girl" earning a Best Pop Collaboration with Vocals nomination and "Love Of My Life" also garnering a Best R&B Song nod.

Commercial performance
Superhero debuted and peaked at number seven on the US Billboard 200, selling 151,000 copies in its first week. This marked McKnight's highest opening sales up to then. On Billboards component charts, it reached number four on the Top R&B/Hip-Hop Albums chart. According to Nielsen SoundScan, Superhero sold  870,000 copies in the United States and was eventually certified gold by the Recording Industry Association of America (RIAA) for the shipment of over 500,000 copies in the United States. Elsewhere, Superhero failed to chart. Billboard ranked it 66th on the Top R&B/Hip-Hop Albums year-end chart.

"Love of My Life" was released as the album's lead single. It peaked at number 51 on the Billboard Hot 100 and reached number 11 in the Hot R&B/Hip-Hop Songs chart. "Still" was issued as the album's second single. While it did not have a physical single released and thus was ineligible to chart on the Billboard Hot 100, it peaked at number 22 on the Adult Contemporary chart. "Tell Me What's It Gonna Be" was released as the third and final single. It reached the lower half of the Billboard Hot 100 and peaked at number 48 on Hot R&B/Hip-Hop Songs chart.

Track listing

Personnel
Credits adapted from the liner notes of Superhero.

 Doug Aldrich – guitar 
 Brandon Barnes – composer
 Battlecat – producer
 Tom Bender – mixing engineer
 Bo Boddie – mixing assistant
 Sandy Brummels – art direction
 Bruce Carbone – executive producer
 Steve Churchyard – engineer
 Pamela Dillard – vocals
 Anthony Dixon – composer, keyboards, synthesizer bass 
 Peter Doell – engineer
 Nate Dogg – vocals, vocals (background)
 Steve Eigner – guitar
 Jason "Jay E" Epperson – producer
 Mark Eshelman – stage manager
 Errin Familia – assistant engineer
 Joaquin Perez Fernandez – assistant engineer
 Vanessa Fernandez – vocals (background)
 Tony Flores – mixing assistant
 Kevin "D.J. Battlecat" Gilliam – composer
 John Goodmanson – mixing
 David Guerrero – assistant engineer, mixing assistant
 Mick Guzauski – mixing
 Nathaniel Hale – composer
 Fred Hammond – vocals
 Jimmy Hoyson – assistant engineer
 Justin Timberlake – vocals
 St. Lunatics – vocals
 Trisno Ishak – vocals (background)
 Brion James – guitar
 Cho-Kyu-Chan – vocals

 Bashiri Johnson – percussion
 Suzie Katayama – orchestra contractor, string contractor
 Lilly Lee – logo design
 Jason Lloyd – stage manager
 Liz Loblack – product manager
 Jeremy Mackenzie – assistant manager
 Tony Marserati – mixing
 Kedar Massenburg – executive producer
 Brian McKnight – bass, composer, guitar, keyboards, multi instruments, producer, vocals, vocals (background)
 Bill Meyers – composer, conductor, horn arrangements, horn conductor, orchestral arrangements, piano, producer, string arrangements, string conductor
 Peter Mokran – mixing
 Anthony Nance – composer, drum programming, programming
 Tim Nitz – engineer
 Dave Pensado – mixing
 Herb Powers – mastering
 Jimmy Randolph – Pro-Tools
 Robert Read – assistant engineer
 Herb Ritts – photography
 Greg Ross – art direction, design
 Ivy Skoff – orchestra production
 Andrew Slade – assistant engineer
 Mary Ann Souza – assistant engineer
 Steve Thompson – mixing, producer
 Herb Trawick – executive producer
 Urban Xchange – vocals
 Tommy Vicari – engineer, mixing
 Paul Wagner – assistant engineer
 Patrick Weber – technical engineer
 Chris Wood – engineer

Charts

Weekly charts

Year-end charts

Certifications

References

External links

Brian McKnight albums
Albums produced by Battlecat (producer)
Albums produced by Brian McKnight
Motown albums
2001 albums